The Rhön Club is an inter-state local history and rambling club in Bavaria, Hesse and Thuringia, with around 25,000 members in 88 branches and is one of the larger German rambling clubs in the Association of German Alpine and Rambling Clubs (Verband Deutscher Gebirgs- und Wandervereine).

Aims 
The club was founded on 6 August 1876 in Gersfeld with the aim of opening up the Rhön Mountains as a hiking and rambling area. Its aim today is the conservation of the valuable natural and cultural countryside of the Rhön from a number of ecological viewpoints, especially:

 the preservation of rare plants
 the care of native animals and the general protection of wildlife
 the conservation of valuable cultural sites
 the fostering of local customs
 the preservation of local folk songs
 the knowledgeable speaking of the dialect
 the care of old cultural objects

Presidents

Literature 

 Rhönklub (publ.): Schneiders Rhönführer. Offizieller Führer des Rhönklubs. Verlag Parzeller, 2005, Fulda, pp. 96 ff.
 Rhönwacht (the Club magazine) (2006, Issue 2, April to Juni)

External links 
 

Clubs and societies in Germany
Hiking organisations in Germany